Villeguillo is a municipality located in the province of Segovia, Castile and León, Spain. According to the 2008 census (INE), the municipality has a population of 191 inhabitants.

History
This village founded about 1247 for Knight Vela. It has a palace of Marquis of Herrera.

References 

Municipalities in the Province of Segovia